Arló is a village in Borsod-Abaúj-Zemplén county, Hungary.

In the 19th and 20th centuries, a Jewish community lived in the village. In 1920, there were 53 Jews in the village
In 1944, most of the village's Jews were murdered in the Holocaust.

The village still has a Jewish cemetery.

References

External links

  in Hungarian
 Street map 

Populated places in Borsod-Abaúj-Zemplén County